Freia is a Norwegian chocolate sweets manufacturing brand. The brand is famous for Freia Melkesjokolade and Kvikk Lunsj, as well as for other candy  and dessert products. The company was acquired by Mondelez International in 1993, and liquidated in 2017.

History

Freia was founded by Olaf Larsen (1867–1920) and Fredrik Wilhelm Hjorth Christensen (1851–) in 1889. Larsen had been experimenting with chocolate for some time and Christensen arranged supplies with cocoa suppliers and paid for machines and the required facilities.

Teal success bought by Johan Throne Holst (1868–1946) in 1892. He took over management from Larsen in 1898 and led the company to commercial success. Holst realized that there was a potential market for edible milk chocolate, in addition to the dark chocolate and other minor products Freia were producing at the time. Holst built up Freia to be Norway's leading chocolate manufacturer.

By the turn of the century, Freia was the leading Norwegian brand in sweets. Since its inception the factory has been in the Rodeløkka neighborhood in the borough of Grünerløkka in Oslo.

In 1916, based on the success in Norway, the Throne-Holst family founded the chocolate factory Marabou in Sundbyberg outside of Stockholm in Sweden and in 1943, moved to the present location in Upplands Väsby. The name Freia (or Freja) could not be used due to a conflicting trademark in Sweden. The name Marabou was chosen instead and is based on the marabou stork which was part of Freia's logo at the time. Production started in 1919, due to shortages in cocoa supply caused by World War I.

In 1990, Freia bought all the shares in Marabou. On 12 October 1992, Norsk Hydro, Procordia and Finnish Paulig sold their shares in Freia Marabou to the Philip Morris company Kraft General Foods, a total of 55% of the shares. A few weeks later, Hershey Foods sold its shares (18.6%), giving Philip Morris full control of Freia. On 22 April 1993, the Ministry of Trade and Industry granted Kraft General Foods Holding Norway Inc a license to take over all the shares in Freia Marabou AS. Freia was purchased by Kraft Foods Nordic for NOK 3 billion.

After Kraft's acquisition, most of the operation remains at Freia's factory in Oslo. Parts of production have been outsourced to Lithuania, Estonia and Sweden, following restructuring from the parent company in the mid-2000s. Since 2012, the owner has been Mondelēz International.

Products 
The company's flagship product has since then been the milk chocolate candy bar, Freia Melkesjokolade. On the basis of this famous product, Freia produces several other candy bars, with added nuts, raisins, cookies and Daim pieces. The brand has constantly been marketed in a national romantic spirit – as the essence of everything that is Norwegian. Their slogan is Et lite stykke Norge (A little piece of Norway).

See also
List of bean-to-bar chocolate manufacturers

References

Additional sources
Ibsen, Hilde (1998) Et lite stykke Norge : Freia 100 år  (Tano Aschehoug) ,

External links

Freia official website
Kraft Foods Nordic official website

Norwegian chocolate companies
Food and drink companies established in 1889
Manufacturing companies based in Oslo
Norwegian brands
Mondelez International brands
1993 mergers and acquisitions
Norwegian companies established in 1889